Ataxocerithium huttoni is a species of medium-sized sea snail, a marine gastropod mollusc in the family Cerithiidae.

References

Further reading 
 Powell A W B, William Collins Publishers Ltd, Auckland 1979 

Cerithiidae
Gastropods of New Zealand
Gastropods described in 1895